Lemon Memory is the second studio album by English surf punk band Menace Beach. It was released on January 20, 2017, by Memphis Industries.

Track listing 
On 5 October 2016, the track listing was confirmed.

References 

2017 albums
Memphis Industries albums
Menace Beach (band) albums